Colegio San Agustín may refer to the following Augustinian schools:

Philippines
Colegio San Agustin – Bacolod in Negros Occidental, Philippines
Colegio San Agustin – Biñan in Laguna, Philippines
Colegio San Agustin – Makati in Metro Manila, Philippines

Other
Colegio San Agustín (Chile) in Santiago, Chile
Colegio San Agustín (Cochabamba) in Cochabamba, Bolivia
Colegio San Agustín (Lima) in Lima, Peru

See also
San Agustin Academy (Panglao)
Saint Augustine Elementary School (disambiguation)
St. Augustine's College (disambiguation)
St. Augustine High School (disambiguation)
University of San Agustin